"They Want EFX" is a song by American hip hop group Das EFX recorded for their debut album Dead Serious (1992). The song was released as the group's debut single for the album in March 1992. The song samples "Buffalo Gals" by Malcolm McLaren and "Blind Man Can See It" by James Brown.

Track listings

12", Vinyl
"They Want EFX" (Dead Serious) - 3:49
"They Want EFX" (Instrumental) - 3:39
"They Want EFX" (Remix) - 3:55
"They Want EFX" (Dub) - 3:55

Cassette, Maxi-Single
"They Want EFX" (Remix) - 3:49
"They Want EFX" (Dead Serious) - 3:39
"Jussumen" (LP Version) - 3:29
"They Want EFX" (Dub) - 3:55
"They Want EFX" (Instrumental) - 3:55

CD, Promo
"They Want EFX" (Remix) - 3:49
"They Want EFX" (Dead Serious) - 3:39

Personnel
Information taken from Discogs.
arranging: Das EFX (W. Hines, A. Weston)
co-production: Kevin Byrdsong, Marcus Logan
engineering: Bobby Sarsur, Solid Scheme (C. Charity, D. Lynch)
executive production: EPMD
guitar: Bobby Sitchran
mastering: Tony Dawsey
mixing: Bobby Sarsur
production: Das EFX
remixing: Solid Scheme
writing: Das EFX, C. Bobbit, J. Brown, F. Wesley

Charts

Weekly charts

Year-end charts

Notes

1992 debut singles
Das EFX songs
1992 songs
East West Records singles
Songs written by Fred Wesley
Songs written by James Brown